Pervomayskoye is a rural locality (a selo) in Khasavyurtovsky District, Republic of Dagestan, Russia. The population was 1,228 as of 2010. There are 13 streets.

Geography 
Pervomayskoye is located 37 km northwest of Khasavyurt (the district's administrative centre) by road. Sovetskoye is the nearest rural locality.

References 

Rural localities in Khasavyurtovsky District